Nenad Nikolić (born 7 January 1959) is a Croatian football coach and former player who has worked in Iran for more than a decade. He has worked in the Foolad academy since it began in 1999.

He was appointed head of the RNK Split Academy.

References

External links
 
 

1959 births
Living people
Footballers from Split, Croatia
Croatian people of Serbian descent
Association football defenders
Yugoslav footballers
NK GOŠK Dubrovnik players
NK Maribor players
NK Primorac 1929 players
Croatian football managers
Foolad F.C. managers
Iran national under-20 football team managers
Olympic football managers of Iran
Yemen national football team managers
Persian Gulf Pro League managers
Croatian expatriate football managers
Expatriate football managers in Iran
Croatian expatriate sportspeople in Iran
Expatriate football managers in Yemen
Croatian expatriate sportspeople in Yemen
Croatian expatriate sportspeople in Slovakia